"We'll Be Together" is a 1988 pop song performed by German singer Sandra from her third studio album Into a Secret Land. It was written by Hubert Kemmler, Markus Löhr, Klaus Hirschburger and Sandra Cretu, and produced by Michael Cretu. This is the only song along with "When the Rain Doesn't Come" (from the 1992 album Close to Seven) that was written or co-written by Sandra herself, prior to the 2007 album The Art of Love.

"We'll Be Together" was released as the third single from Into a Secret Land in January 1989. For the single release, the song was remixed and labelled as the "'89 Remix". The single was a top 10 hit in Germany and a top 20 hit in France and Austria. It also entered the top 20 on the German and Austrian airplay charts.

The music video was directed by Bulle Bernd in Ibiza, Spain and Cannes, France. The clip was released on Sandra's VHS video compilation 18 Greatest Hits in 1992 as well as the 2003 DVD The Complete History.

In 1999, a remix of the song was released on Sandra's compilation My Favourites. The track was remixed again for her 2006 compilation Reflections.

Formats and track listings
 7" single
A. "We'll Be Together" (Single Version) – 3:49 
B. "It Means Forever" (Instrumental) – 3:43

 12" maxi single & CD maxi single
A. "We'll Be Together" (Extended Version) – 6:45
B1. "It Means Forever" (Dub Version) – 3:43
B2. "We'll Be Together" (Single Version) – 3:49

Charts

Weekly charts

Year-end charts

References

External links
 "We'll Be Together" at Discogs
 The official Sandra YouTube channel

1988 songs
1989 singles
Sandra (singer) songs
Song recordings produced by Michael Cretu
Songs written by Hubert Kemmler
Songs written by Klaus Hirschburger
Songs written by Markus Löhr
Virgin Records singles